The Dolch word list is a list of frequently used English words (also known as sight words), compiled by Edward William Dolch, a major proponent of the  "whole-word" method of beginning reading instruction. The list was first published in a journal article in 1936 and then published in his book Problems in Reading in 1948.

Dolch compiled the list based on children's books of his era, which is why nouns such as "kitty" and "Santa Claus" appear on the list instead of more current high-frequency words. The list contains 220 "service words" that Dolch thought should be easily recognized in order to achieve reading fluency in the English language. The compilation excludes nouns, which comprise a separate 95-word list. According to Dolch, between 50% and 75% of all words used in schoolbooks, library books, newspapers, and magazines are a part of the Dolch basic sight word vocabulary; however, bear in mind that he compiled this list in 1936.

Critics

Critics of teaching reading using whole word and whole language methods (and proponents of phonics) maintain that memorizing whole words may do more harm than good because it takes time away from the important aspect of practicing basic decoding techniques.

Cognitive neuroscientist, Stanislas Dehaene, writes "cognitive psychology directly refutes any notion of teaching via a 'global' or 'whole language' method." He goes on to talk about "the myth of whole-word reading" (also: sight words), saying it has been refuted by recent experiments. "We do not recognize a printed word through a holistic grasping of its contours, because our brain breaks it down into letters and graphemes." Cognitive neuroscientist, Mark Seidenberg, says "the persistence of the whole language ideas despite the mass of evidence against them is most striking at this point", and goes on to describe it as a "theoretical zombie" because it persists in spite of a lack of supporting evidence. In addition, according to research, whole-word memorisation is "labor-intensive", requiring on average about 35 trials per word.

Teaching strategies

These lists of words are still assigned for memorization in elementary schools in America and elsewhere. Although most of the 220 Dolch words are phonetic, children are sometimes told that they can't be "sounded out" using common sound-to-letter phonics patterns and have to be learned by sight; hence the alternative term, "sight word". The list is divided according to the educational stage in which it was intended that children would memorize these words.

Some educators say the Dolch list can be useful if teachers do not teach children to memorize them; instead, they teach the words by using an explicit, systematic phonics approach, perhaps by using a tool such as Elkonin boxes.

Some educators prefer to use the 1000 Instant Word list prepared in 1979 by Edward Fry, professor of Education and Director of the Reading Center at Rutgers University and Loyola University in Los Angeles.

Dolch list: Non-nouns

Pre-primer: 
(40 words) a, and, away, big, blue, can, come, down, find, for, funny, go, help, here, I, in, is, it, jump, little, look, make, me, my, not, one, play, red, run, said, see, the, three, to, two, up, we, where, yellow, you

Primer: 
(52 words) all, am, are, at, ate, be, black, brown, but, came, did, do, eat, four, get, good, have, he, into, like, must, new, no, now, on, our, out, please, pretty, ran, ride, saw, say, she, so, soon, that, there, they, this, too, under, want, was, well, went, what, white, who, will, with, yes

1st Grade: 
(41 words) after, again, an, any, as, ask, by, could, every, fly, from, give, going, had, has, her, him, his, how, just, know, let, live, may, of, old, once, open, over, put, round, some, stop, take, thank, them, then, think, walk, were, when

2nd Grade:
(46 words) always, around, because, been, before, best, both, buy, call, cold, does, don't, fast, first, five, found, gave, goes, green, its, made, many, off, or, pull, read, right, sing, sit, sleep, tell, their, these, those, upon, us, use, very, wash, which, why, wish, work, would, write, your

3rd Grade: 
(41 words) about, better, bring, carry, clean, cut, done, draw, drink, eight, fall, far, full, got, grow, hold, hot, hurt, if, keep, kind, laugh, light, long, much, myself, never, only, own, pick, seven, shall, show, six, small, start, ten, today, together, try, warm

Dolch list: Nouns
(95 words) apple, baby, back, ball, bear, bed, bell, bird, birthday, boat, box, boy, bread, brother, cake, car, cat, chair, chicken, children, Christmas, coat, corn, cow, day, dog, doll, door, duck, egg, eye, farm, farmer, father, feet, fire, fish, floor, flower, game, garden, girl, good-bye, grass, ground, hand, head, hill, home, horse, house, kitty, leg, letter, man, men, milk, money, morning, mother, name, nest, night, paper, party, picture, pig, rabbit, rain, ring, robin, Santa Claus, school, seed, sheep, shoe, sister, snow, song, squirrel, stick, street, sun, table, thing, time, top, toy, tree, watch, water, way, wind, window, wood

See also
 General Service List
 Learning to read
 Most common words in English
 Phonics
 Reading education
 Sight word
 Swadesh list
 Synthetic phonics
 Teaching reading
 Word wall

References

External links
 Dolch flash cards by level w/ voice
 Animated Dolch Quizzes
 Learn Dolch Sight Words with Picture me Reading
 Dolch Word - Free sight word games and printables

Learning to read
Reading (process)
Word lists
1936 documents